Point Mountain is a mountain located in the Catskill Mountains of New York south of Hancock. Hawk Mountain is located northeast, Jehu Mountain is located east, McCoys Knob is located south-southeast and Coon Hill is located north of Point Mountain.

References

Mountains of Delaware County, New York
Mountains of New York (state)